The Presbyterian Church in Korea (JangShin) is a Reformed denomination in South Korea, started in 1977 a group of ministers who graduated from the HwanWon Seminary under the leadership of Robert s. Rapp. JangShin integrated other denominations and grew in numbers. In 2004 it had 19,000 members and 209 congregations in 9 Presbyteries and a General Assembly. JangShin affirms the Apostles Creed and Westminster Confession.

References 

Presbyterian denominations in South Korea